This is a list of notable Japanese restaurants. Japanese cuisine is the food—ingredients, preparation and way of eating—of Japan. The traditional food of Japan is based on rice with miso soup and other dishes, each in its own utensil, with an emphasis on seasonal ingredients. The side dishes often consist of fish, pickled vegetables, and vegetables cooked in broth. Fish is common in the traditional cuisine. It is often grilled, but it may also be served raw as sashimi or in sushi. Apart from rice, staples include noodles, such as soba and udon. Japan has many simmered dishes such as fish products in broth called oden, or beef in sukiyaki and nikujaga.

Japanese restaurants

 Afuri
 Ajisen Ramen – Japanese ramen soup fast food chain
 The Araki
 Benihana – an American restaurant company based in Aventura, Florida. It owns or franchises 116 Japanese cuisine restaurants around the world
 Behind the Museum Café, Portland, Oregon
 Bergh–Stoutenburgh House
 Bincho – a London-based Japanese restaurant styled on the traditional izakayas found throughout Japan
 Biwa, Portland, Oregon, U.S.
 Bone Daddies – restaurant with multiple branches in London, UK
 Boxer Ramen
 Feng Sushi – a UK-based restaurant chain known for advocating sustainable fish farming.
 Freshness Burger – a fast food restaurant from Japan founded in 1992, it purveys hamburgers, sandwiches, salads, and coffee drinks
 Hapa PDX, Portland, Oregon
 Hayato, Los Angeles
 HokBen – a Japanese fast food chain of restaurants based in Jakarta, Indonesia
 Hokka Hokka Tei – a bento take-out chain with over 2,000 franchises and company-owned branches throughout Japan
 Ichibanya – owns the top curry rice restaurant chain in Japan, Curry House CoCo Ichibanya
 Ii-ma Sushi – a Japanese sushi restaurant operating in South London, UK
 Italian Tomato – a Japanese Italian restaurant and bakery chain
 Itsu – a British chain of Asian-inspired fast food shops and restaurants, and a grocery company
 Ivan Ramen – a ramen noodle restaurant with two locations in New York City
 Izumi
 Jinya Ramen Bar – a chain of restaurants based in Los Angeles, California, specializing in ramen noodle dishes
 Kamonegi, Seattle
 Katsu Burger
 Kayabukiya Tavern – a traditional-style Japanese "sake-house" restaurant (izakaya) located in the city of Utsunomiya, north of Tokyo, Japan 
 Kinboshi Ramen – Portland, Oregon
 Kissa Tanto – a Japanese-Italian fusion restaurant in Vancouver, British Columbia
 Kokoro – a Korean-Japanese sushi restaurant chain operating throughout the UK
 Kona Grill – a restaurant company based in Scottsdale, Arizona that owns and operates over 30 locations in the United States
 Koni Store – a Brazilian chain of Japanese food headquartered in Rio de Janeiro, Brazil
 Marugame Seimen – A Japanese restaurant chain specializing in udon
 Marukin Ramen
 Masa – a Japanese and sushi restaurant located in Manhattan, New York City
 Matsugen – the name of several Japanese restaurants owned by the Matsushita brothers located in Tokyo, Hawaii, and New York City
 Matsuya – a Japanese fast-food chain specializing in rice bowls with meat
 Momiji, Seattle
 Morihiro
 MOS Burger – a fast-food restaurant chain (fast-casual) that originated in Japan, it is now the second-largest fast-food franchise in Japan after McDonald's Japan. The MOS Rice Burger uses a bun made of rice mixed with barley and millet.
 Nihonryori Ryugin – a fusion cuisine restaurant in Roppongi, Minato-ku, Tokyo
Nippon – the oldest operating Japanese restaurant in Manhattan, the first to serve Sushi and Fugu and birthplace of the Beef Negimayaki
 Nozawa Bar
 O Ya (restaurant), Boston
 Okonomi-mura – a Hiroshima-style okonomiyaki food theme park located at 5-13 Shintenchi in Naka-ku, Hiroshima, Japan.
 Ooink, Seattle
 Q Sushi
 Ramen Ryoma
 Saburo's, Portland, Oregon
 Sakae Sushi – a restaurant chain based in Singapore serving Japanese cuisine, and is the flagship brand of Apex-Pal International Ltd.
Sarku Japan – an American quick serve restaurant chain based in Markham, Ontario, Canada serving Japanese teppanyaki and sushi
 Sasabune – a Japanese sushi restaurant located on the Upper East Side of Manhattan, in New York City
 Soichi, San Diego
 Standing Sushi Bar – a Japanese-food restaurant chain in Singapore and Indonesia
 Sticks'n'Sushi – a Copenhagen-based restaurant and take-away chain specializing in sushi and yakitori sticks
 Sukiya – a chain of gyūdon (beef bowl) restaurants
 Sukiyabashi Jiro – a sushi restaurant in Ginza, Chūō, Tokyo, Japan, it is owned and operated by sushi master Jiro Ono. The Michelin Guide has awarded it 3 stars. A two-star branch operated by his son Takashi is located at Roppongi Hills in Minato, Tokyo.
 Sushi Ginza Onodera, West Hollywood, California
 Sushi Kaneyoshi, Los Angeles
 Sushi of Gari – a Japanese sushi restaurant located on the Upper East Side of Manhattan, New York City
 Sushi Saito – a three Michelin star Japanese cuisine restaurant in Minato, Tokyo, primarily known for serving sushi.
 Sushi Seki – a Japanese sushi restaurant located on the Upper East Side in Manhattan, New York City
 Sushi Tadokoro
 Sushi Yasuda – a Japanese sushi restaurant located in the Grand Central area of Midtown Manhattan, New York City
Taku (restaurant) – a Japanese restaurant located in Seattle's Capitol Hill neighborhood at 706 East Pike Street. It was owned by Shota Nakajima.
 Tanaka, Portland, Oregon
 Tetsuya's – a restaurant in Sydney, Australia, owned and operated by world renowned chef Tetsuya Wakuda.
 Thomas Hynes House – today it is used as one of Nobu Matsuhisa's eponymous Japanese restaurants
 Tokyo Diner – a three-floor Japanese restaurant on the corner of Newport Place and Lisle Street in the "Chinatown" area of the West End of London
 Wagamama – restaurant chain in the UK
 Wasabi – restaurant chain based in the UK
 Yoshinoya – a Japanese fast food restaurant chain, it is the largest chain of gyūdon (beef bowl) restaurants
 Yoshi's – a jazz club of the San Francisco Bay Area, it started as a Japanese restaurant in Berkeley
 Yume Wo Katare – a ramen shop in Cambridge, Massachusetts, where diners are encouraged to share their dreams and aspirations to their fellow diners after finishing their meal
 Zuma – founded by chef Rainer Becker, inspired by informal izakaya-style Japanese dining in which dishes are brought to the table continuously throughout the meal

Types of restaurants
 Conveyor belt sushi – a sushi restaurant where the plates with the sushi are placed on a rotating conveyor belt or moat that winds through the restaurant and moves past every table and counter seat 
 Izakaya – an informal Japanese gastropub
 Robatayaki – a method of cooking, similar to barbecue, in which items of food on skewers are slow-grilled over hot charcoal
 Ryōtei – a type of luxurious traditional Japanese restaurant. Traditionally they only accept new customers by referral and feature entertainment by geishas, but in modern times this is not always the case
 Teppanyaki – a style of Japanese cuisine that uses an iron griddle to cook food

See also

 List of Japanese condiments
 List of Japanese cooking utensils
 List of Japanese dishes
 List of Japanese desserts and sweets
 List of Japanese ingredients
 Lists of restaurants
 List of sushi restaurants
 Ramen shop
 Restaurants in Japan (category)

References

External links
 

 
Lists of ethnic restaurants
Restaurants